is a song recorded by Japanese singer Shizuka Kudo, from her debut solo studio album Mysterious. It was released through Canyon Records as the lead single from Mysterious on August 31, 1987.

Background
"Kindan no Telepathy" was written and produced by Yasushi Akimoto and Tsugutoshi Gotō, the same duo behind all five singles of the Onyanko Club offshoot idol group Ushirogami Hikaretai, of which Kudo was still an active member when she made her solo debut. Its lyrics describe the intuitive feeling about a romantic breakup that the protagonist is pretending to ignore. "Kindan no Telepathy" debuted at number-one on the Oricon Singles Chart and charted for eight weeks.

Track listing

Charts

Nana Katase version

In 2004, Japanese singer Nana Katase released a dance-pop inspired rendition of "Kindan no Telepathy" as the second single from her second album Extended, on which she covered seven hit songs from the 1980s. Katase's version was produced by Hirata Shōichirō. "Kindan no Telepathy" was the sixth and final single released by Katase. It debuted at number 38 on the Oricon Singles Chart and charted for two weeks.

Track listing

Charts

See also
 List of Oricon number-one singles

References

1987 songs
1987 debut singles
2004 singles
Torch songs
Songs with lyrics by Yasushi Akimoto
Oricon Weekly number-one singles
Shizuka Kudo songs
Pony Canyon singles
Songs written by Tsugutoshi Gotō